In the 2020–22 season, Étoile Sportive du Sahel is competing in the Ligue 1 for the 66th season, as well as the Tunisian Cup.  It is their 67th consecutive season in the top flight of Tunisian football. They are competing in Ligue 1, the Champions League and the Tunisian Cup.

Squad list
Players and squad numbers last updated on 13 August 2021.Note: Flags indicate national team as has been defined under FIFA eligibility rules. Players may hold more than one non-FIFA nationality.

Competitions

Overview

{| class="wikitable" style="text-align: center"
|-
!rowspan=2|Competition
!colspan=8|Record
!rowspan=2|Started round
!rowspan=2|Final position / round
!rowspan=2|First match
!rowspan=2|Last match
|-
!
!
!
!
!
!
!
!
|-
| Ligue 1

| 
| style="background:silver;"| Runners–up
| 6 December 2020
| 19 May 2021
|-
| Tunisian Cup

| Round of 32
| Round of 16
| 6 May 2021
| 30 May 2021
|-
| Confederation Cup

| First round
| Group stage
| 22 December 2020
| 28 April 2021
|-
! Total

|bgcolor=silver colspan=4|

Ligue 1

League table

Results summary

Results by round

Matches

Tunisian Cup

Confederation Cup

First round

Play-off round

Group stage

Group C

Squad information

Playing statistics

|-
! colspan=14 style=background:#dcdcdc; text-align:center| Goalkeepers

|-
! colspan=14 style=background:#dcdcdc; text-align:center| Defenders

|-
! colspan=14 style=background:#dcdcdc; text-align:center| Midfielders

|-
! colspan=14 style=background:#dcdcdc; text-align:center| Forwards

|-
! colspan=14 style=background:#dcdcdc; text-align:center| Players transferred out during the season

Goalscorers
Includes all competitive matches. The list is sorted alphabetically by surname when total goals are equal.

Transfers

In

Out

Notes

References

2020-21
Tunisian football clubs 2020–21 season